Rozstání is the name of several locations in the Czech Republic:

 Rozstání (Prostějov District), a village in the Olomouc Region
 Rozstání (Světlá pod Ještědem), a village in the Liberec Region
 Rozstání (Svitavy District), a village in the Pardubice Region